The 2006 WAFL season was the 122nd season of the various incarnations of the West Australian Football League. Owing to low crowds making the city's traditional big-match venue, Subiaco Oval, uneconomic due to high overheads, the WAFL followed the AFL since 1991 by scheduling finals (except the Grand Final) at the home ground of the club higher on the ladder.

It saw the three top clubs of 2005 – Subiaco, South Fremantle and Claremont – intensify their dominance of the competition, being five games and a large percentage ahead of the remaining six clubs and losing only four games to any of the other six clubs. The only major disappointment on-field was East Perth, who for their centenary season invested considerably in recruiting but won only one extra match vis-à-vis 2005 despite widespread expectation the Royals would be the main threat to the power clubs. The Royals had numerous injury problems with their recruits and coach Warren Mahoney resigned after the club lost its first seven games for its longest losing streak since 1929. West Perth after a poor pre-season comfortably took the final place in the four, and Peel Thunder, who suffered from predictions of extreme doom despite having won the past two colts premierships, doubled their 2005 win tally with some excellent football in July and August. Swan Districts, finalists in 2004 and 2005, began well but a horror run with injuries after May whereby they lost sole ruckman Taylan Ames, Shane Beros, Craig Callaghan and Daniel Wulf meant that after inflicting the first defeat upon Subiaco the Swans could win only one of their final eleven matches, losing many of the others in spectacular fashion.

A record dry year helped produce a marked increase in scoring compared with the past decade, with the average score of 99.41 points per team per game as much as thirteen points higher than the previous season and the highest in the WAFL or Westar Rules since 1991. Included in this was a record half-time margin and the highest score in the WAFL since 1987 by South Fremantle against their struggling derby rivals, who took their second wooden spoon in three years as a dwindling support base and severe financial deficits meant the Sharks could not compete for the best players with the stronger clubs.

Home-and-away season

Round 1

Round 2

Round 3

Round 4 (Easter weekend)

Round 5

Round 6

Round 7

Round 8

Round 9

Round 10

Round 11

Round 12

Round 13

Round 14

Round 15

Round 16

Round 17

Round 18

Round 19

Round 20

Round 21

Round 22

Round 23

Ladder

Finals

First semi-final

Second semi-final

Preliminary final

Grand Final

Notes
Their sole lower score in this period was 2.4 (16) at Lathlain Park in Round 15 of 1967, when Old Easts did not score between the first and last ten minutes of the match.Had Malseed been able to kick the goal, he would have produced Perth's first draw since the opening round of 1986, the first draw between the two clubs since 1923, and East Fremantle's first home-and-away draw since the third round of 1974. The latter two streaks remain unbroken as of 2014.

References

External links
Official WAFL website
WAFLFootyFacts 2006 Season Review
West Australian Football League (WAFL), 2006

West Australian Football League seasons
WAFL